Wardenclyffe Tower (1901–1917), also known as the Tesla Tower, was an early experimental wireless transmission station designed and built by Nikola Tesla on Long Island in 1901–1902, located in the village of Shoreham, New York. Tesla intended to transmit messages, telephony, and even facsimile images across the Atlantic to England and to ships at sea based on his theories of using the Earth to conduct the signals. His decision to increase the scale of the facility and implement his ideas of wireless power transmission to better compete with Guglielmo Marconi's radio-based telegraph system was met with refusal to fund the changes by the project's primary backer, financier J. P. Morgan. Additional investment could not be found, and the project was abandoned in 1906, never to become operational.

In an attempt to satisfy Tesla's debts, the tower was demolished for scrap in 1917 and the property taken in foreclosure in 1922. For 50 years, Wardenclyffe was a processing facility producing photography supplies.

In the 1980s and 2000s, hazardous waste from the photographic era was cleaned up, and the site was sold and cleared for new development. A grassroots campaign to save the site succeeded in purchasing the property in 2013, with plans to build a future museum dedicated to Nikola Tesla. In 2018 the property was listed on the National Register of Historic Places.

Design and operational principles

Origin 
Tesla's design for Wardenclyffe grew out of his experiments beginning in the early 1890s. His primary goal in these experiments was to develop a new wireless power transmission system. He discarded the idea of using the newly discovered Hertzian (radio) waves, detected in 1888 by German physicist Heinrich Rudolf Hertz since Tesla doubted they existed and basic physics told him, and most other scientists from that period, that they would only travel in straight lines the way visible light did, meaning they would travel straight out into space becoming "hopelessly lost".

In laboratory work and later large-scale experiments at Colorado Springs in 1899, Tesla developed his own ideas on how a worldwide wireless system would work. He theorized from these experiments that if he injected  electric current into the Earth at just the right frequency he could harness what he believed was the planet's own electrical charge and cause it to resonate at a frequency that would be amplified in "standing waves" that could be tapped anywhere on the planet to run devices or, through modulation, carry a signal. His system was based more on 19th century ideas of electrical conduction and telegraphy instead of the newer theories of airborne electromagnetic waves, with an electrical charge being conducted through the ground and being returned through the air.

Tesla's design used a concept of a charged conductive upper layer in the atmosphere, a theory dating back to an 1872 idea for a proposed wireless power system by Mahlon Loomis. Tesla not only believed that he could use this layer as his return path in his electrical conduction system, but that the power flowing through it would make it glow, providing night time lighting for cities and shipping lanes.

In a February 1901 Collier's Weekly article titled "Talking With Planets" Tesla described his "system of energy transmission and of telegraphy without the use of wires" as:

(using) the Earth itself as the medium for conducting the currents, thus dispensing with wires and all other artificial conductors ... a machine which, to explain its operation in plain language, resembled a pump in its action, drawing electricity from the Earth and driving it back into the same at an enormous rate, thus creating ripples or disturbances which, spreading through the Earth as through a wire, could be detected at great distances by carefully attuned receiving circuits. In this manner I was able to transmit to a distance, not only feeble effects for the purposes of signaling, but considerable amounts of energy, and later discoveries I made convinced me that I shall ultimately succeed in conveying power without wires, for industrial purposes, with high economy, and to any distance, however great.

Although Tesla demonstrated wireless power transmission at Colorado Springs, lighting electric lights mounted outside the building where he had his large experimental coil, he did not scientifically test his theories. He believed he had achieved Earth resonance which, according to his theory, would work at any distance.

Financing 

Tesla was back in New York in January 1900. He had convinced his friend Robert Underwood Johnson, editor of The Century Magazine, to allow him to publish an article covering his work and Johnson had even sent a photographer to Colorado Springs the previous year to photograph Tesla's experiments. The article titled "The Problem of Increasing Human Energy" written by Tesla appeared in the June, 1900 edition of Century Magazine.

Instead of the understandable scientific description Johnson had hoped for it was more of a lengthy philosophical treatise where Tesla described his futuristic ideas on harnessing the sun's energy, control of the weather with electricity, wireless control, and how future inventions would make  war impossible. It also contained what were to become iconic images by photographer Dickenson Alley of Tesla and his Colorado Springs experiments.

Tesla made the rounds in New York trying to find investors for his system of wireless transmission, wining and dining them at the Waldorf-Astoria's Palm Garden (the hotel where he was living at the time), The Players Club and Delmonico's. Tesla first went to his old friend George Westinghouse for help.  Westinghouse seemed like a natural fit for the project given the large-scale AC equipment Westinghouse manufactured and Tesla's need for similar equipment.

Tesla asked Westinghouse to "…meet me on some fair terms in furnishing me the machinery, retaining the ownership of the same and interesting yourself to a certain extent".  While Westinghouse declined to buy into the project, he did agree to lend Tesla $6,000. Westinghouse suggested Tesla pursue some of the rich venture capitalists. Tesla talked to John Jacob Astor, Thomas Fortune Ryan, and even sent a cabochon sapphire ring as a gift to Henry O. Havemeyer. No investment was forthcoming from Havemeyer and Ryan but Astor did buy 500 shares in Tesla's company. Tesla gained the attention of financier J. P. Morgan in November 1900.

Morgan, who was impressed by Guglielmo Marconi's feat of sending reports from the America's Cup yacht races off Long Island back to New York City via radio-based wireless the previous year, was dubious about the feasibility and patent priority of Tesla's system.

In several discussions Tesla assured Morgan his system was superior to, and based on patents that superseded, that of Marconi and of other wireless inventors, and that it would far outpace the performance of its main competitor, the transatlantic telegraph cable. Morgan signed a contract with Tesla in March 1901, agreeing to give the inventor $150,000 to develop and build a wireless station on Long Island, New York, capable of sending wireless messages to London as well as ships at sea. The deal also included Morgan having a 51% interest in the company as well as a 51% share in present and future wireless patents developed from the project.

Design changes and financial problems 

Tesla began working on his wireless station immediately. As soon as the contract was signed with Morgan in March 1901 he placed an order for generators and transformers with the Westinghouse Electric Company. Tesla's plans changed radically after he read a June 1901 Electrical Review article by Marconi titled "Syntonic Wireless Telegraph".

At this point Marconi was transmitting radio signals beyond the range most physicists thought possible (over the horizon) and the description of the Italian inventor's use of a "Tesla coil" "connected to the Earth" led Tesla to believe Marconi was copying his earth resonance system to do it. Tesla, believing a small pilot system capable of sending Morse code yacht race results to Morgan in Europe would not be able to capture the attention of potential investors, decided to scale up his designs with a much more powerful transmitter, incorporating his ideas of advanced telephone and image transmission as well as his ideas of wireless power delivery.

In July 1901 Tesla informed Morgan of his planned changes to the project and the need for much more money to build it. He explained the more grandiose plan as a way to leap ahead of competitors and secure much larger profits on the investment. With Tesla basically proposing a breach of contract, Morgan refused to lend additional funds and demanded an account of money already spent. Tesla would claim a few years later that funds were also running short because of Morgan's role in triggering the stock market panic of 1901, making everything Tesla had to buy much more expensive.

Despite Morgan stating no additional funds would be supplied, Tesla continued on with the project. He explored the idea of building several small towers or a tower 300 feet and even 600 feet tall in order to transmit the type of low-frequency long waves that Tesla thought were needed to resonate the Earth. His friend, architect Stanford White, who was working on designing structures for the project, calculated that a 600-foot tower would cost $450,000 and the idea had to be scrapped.

Plant at Wardenclyffe 
Tesla purchased  of land close to a railway line  from New York City in Shoreham on Long Island Sound from land developer James S. Warden who was building a resort community known as Wardenclyffe-On-Sound. Tesla would later state his plans were to eventually make Wardenclyffe a hub "city" in his plans for a worldwide system of 30 wireless plants, sending messages and media content and broadcasting electrical power. The land surrounding the Wardenclyffe plant was intended to be what Tesla would later in life refer to as a "radio city" with factories producing Tesla's patented devices. Warden expected to build housing on the part of his remaining land for the expected 2,000–2,500 Tesla employees. At the end of July 1901 Tesla closed a contract for the building of the wireless telegraph plant and electrical laboratory at Wardenclyffe.

It had a 55-ton steel (some report it was a better conducting material, such as copper) hemispherical structure at the top (referred to as a cupola). The structure was such as to allow each piece to be taken out and replaced as necessary.

The main building occupied the rest of the facility grounds. Stanford White designed the Wardenclyffe facility main building. It included a laboratory area, instrumentation room, boiler room, generator room and machine shop. Inside the main building, there were electromechanical devices, electrical generators, electrical transformers, glass blowing equipment, X-ray devices, Tesla coils, a remote controlled boat, cases with bulbs and tubes, wires, cables, a library, and an office. It was constructed in the style of the Italian Renaissance. The tower was designed by W.D. Crow, an associate of White.

There was a great deal of construction under the tower to establish some form of ground connection but Tesla and his workers kept the public and the press away from the project so little is known. The descriptions (some from Tesla's 1923 testimony in foreclosure proceedings on the property) include that the facility had a ten by twelve foot wood and steel lined shaft sunk into the ground  beneath the tower with a stairway inside it. Tesla stated that at the bottom of the shaft he "had special machines rigged up which would push the iron pipe, one length after another, and I pushed these iron pipes, I think sixteen of them, three hundred feet, and then the current through these pipes takes hold of the earth." In Tesla's words the function of this was "to have a grip on the earth so the whole of this globe can quiver." There is also contemporaneous and later descriptions of four 100 foot long tunnels, possibly brick lined and waterproofed, radiating from the bottom of the shaft north, south, east, and west terminating back at ground level in little brick igloos. Speculation on the tunnels ranges from them being for drainage, acting as access ways, or having the function of enhancing ground connection or resonance by interacting with the water table below the tower, maybe via being filled with salt water or liquid nitrogen.

The Tesla biographer John Joseph O'Neill noted the cupola at the top of the 186 foot tower had a 5-foot hole in its top where ultraviolet lights were to be mounted, perhaps to create an ionized path up through the atmosphere that could conduct electricity. How Tesla intended to employ the ground conduction method and atmospheric method in Wardenclyffe's design is unknown. Power for the entire system was to be provided by a coal fired 200 kilowatt Westinghouse alternating current industrial generator.

Construction began in September 1901 but money was so short (with Morgan still owing Tesla the remainder of the original $150,000 promised) Tesla complained in a letter to White he was facing foreclosure. Tesla kept writing Morgan letters pleading for more money and assuring the financier his wireless system would be superior to Marconi's, but in December Tesla's plans were dealt another serious blow when Marconi announced to the world he was able to send a wireless transmission (the Morse code for the letter S) across the Atlantic.

Construction at Wardenclyffe continued through 1902 and in June of that year Tesla began moving his laboratory operations from 46 East Houston Street laboratory to the 94-foot-square brick building at Wardenclyffe. By the end of 1902 the tower reached full height of 187 feet. What Tesla was up to at Wardenclyffe and the site itself was generally kept from the public. Tesla would respond to reporters inquiries stating there was a similar wireless plant in Scotland and that "We have been sending wireless messages for long distances from this station for some time, but whether we are going into the telegraph field on a commercial basis I cannot say at present."

Tesla continued to write to Morgan asking the investor to reconsider his position on the contract and invest the additional funds the project needed. In a July 3, 1903 letter Tesla wrote "Will you help me or let my great work — almost complete — go to pots?" Morgan's reply on July 14 was "I have received your letter and in reply would say that I should not feel disposed at present to make any further advances". The night of Morgan's reply, and several nights after, newspapers reported that the Wardenclyffe tower came alive shooting off bright flashes lighting up the night sky. No explanation was forthcoming from Tesla or any of his workers as to the meaning of the display and Wardenclyffe never seemed to operate again.

Tesla's finances continued to unravel. Investor money on Wall Street was continuing to flow to Marconi's system, which was making regular transmissions, and  doing it with equipment far less expensive than the "wireless plant" Tesla was attempting to build. Some in the press began turning against Tesla's project claiming it was a hoax and the fall 1903 "rich man's panic" on Wall Street dried up investment further. Some money came from Thomas Fortune Ryan but the funds went towards the debt on the project instead of funding any further construction. Investors seemed to be shying away from putting money into a project that J. P. Morgan had abandoned. Tesla continued to write Morgan trying to get extra funding stating his "knowledge and ability" "if applied effectively would advance the world a century". Morgan would only reply through his secretary saying "it will be impossible for [me/ Morgan] to do anything in the matter". Tesla's attempts to raise money by getting the US Navy interested in his remote control boat/torpedo and other attempts to commercialize his inventions went nowhere.  In May 1905, Tesla's patents on alternating current motors and other methods of power transmission expired, halting royalty payments and causing a further severe reduction of funding to the Wardenclyffe Tower. In an attempt to find alternative funding Tesla advertised the services of the Wardenclyffe facility but he was met with little success.

Abandonment 
In 1906 the financial problems and other events may have led to what Tesla biographer Marc J. Seifer suspects was a nervous breakdown on Tesla's part. In June architect Stanford White was murdered by  Harry Kendall Thaw over White's affair with Thaw's wife, actress Evelyn Nesbit. In October long time investor William Rankine died of a heart attack. Things were so bad by the fall of that year George Scherff, Tesla's chief manager who had been supervising Wardenclyffe, had to leave to find other employment. The people living around Wardenclyffe noticed the Tesla plant seemed to have been abandoned without notice.

In 1904 Tesla took out a mortgage on the Wardenclyffe property with George C. Boldt, proprietor of the Waldorf-Astoria Hotel, to cover Tesla's living expenses at the hotel. In 1908 Tesla procured a second mortgage from Boldt to further cover expenses. The facility was partially abandoned around 1911, and the tower structure deteriorated. Between 1912 and 1915, Tesla's finances unraveled, and when the funders wanted to know how they were going to recoup their investments, Tesla was unable to give satisfactory answers.

The March 1, 1916 edition of the publication Export American Industries ran a story titled "Tesla's Million Dollar Folly" describing the abandoned Wardenclyffe site:

There everything seemed left as for a day — chairs, desks, and papers in businesslike array. The great wheels seemed only awaiting Monday life. But the magic word has not been spoken, and the spell still rests on the great plant.

By mid-1917 the facility's main building was breached and vandalized.

Demolition 

By 1915, Tesla's accumulated debt at the Waldorf-Astoria was around $20,000 ($ in  dollars).  When Tesla was unable to make any further payments on the mortgages, Boldt foreclosed on the Wardenclyffe property. Boldt failed to find any use for the property and finally decided to demolish the tower for scrap. On July 4, 1917, the Smiley Steel Company of New York began demolition of the tower by dynamiting it. The tower was knocked on a tilt by the initial explosion but it took until September to totally demolish it. The scrap value realized was $1750.

Since this was during World War I a rumor spread, picked up by newspapers and other publications, that the tower was demolished on orders of the United States Government with claims German spies were using it as a radio transmitter or observation post, or that it was being used as a landmark for German submarines. Tesla was not pleased with what he saw as attacks on his patriotism via the rumors about Wardenclyffe, but since the original mortgages with Boldt as well as the foreclosure had been kept off the public record in order to hide his financial difficulties, Tesla was not able to reveal the real reason for the demolition.

George Boldt decided to make the property available for sale. On April 20, 1922, Tesla lost an appeal of judgment on Boldt's foreclosure. This effectively locked Tesla out of any future development of the facility.

Post-Tesla era 
In 1925, the property ownership was transferred to Walter L. Johnson of Brooklyn. On March 6, 1939, Plantacres, Inc. purchased the facility's land and subsequently leased it to Peerless Photo Products, Inc.

AGFA Corporation bought the property from Peerless and used the site from 1969 to 1992 before closing the facility. The site has undergone a final cleanup of waste produced during its Photo Products era. The clean up was conducted under the scrutiny of the New York State Department of Environmental Conservation, and paid for by AGFA.

In 2009, AGFA put the property up for sale for $1,650,000. The main building remains standing to this day; AGFA advertised that the land can "be delivered fully cleared and level." It says it spent $5 million through September 2008 cleaning up silver and cadmium. A non-profit preservation organization supported by The Oatmeal purchased the land in 2013 with hopes to create a museum to Tesla there.

Landmarking 
On February 14, 1967, the nonprofit public benefit corporation Brookhaven Town Historical Trust was established. It selected the Wardenclyffe facility to be designated as a historic site and as the first site to be preserved by the Trust on March 3, 1967. The Brookhaven Town Historic Trust was rescinded by resolution on February 1, 1972. There were never any appointments made after a legal opinion was received; it was never set up properly. On July 7, 1976, a plaque from Yugoslavia was installed by representatives from Brookhaven National Laboratory near the entrance of the building. It reads:

The sign was stolen from the property in November 2009. An anonymous benefactor is offering a $2,000 reward if it is returned to the property.

In 1976, an application was filed to nominate the main building for listing on the National Register of Historic Places (NRHP). It failed to get approval. The Tesla Wardenclyffe Project, Inc.  was established in 1994 for the purpose of seeking placement of the Wardenclyffe laboratory-office building and the Tesla tower foundation on both the New York State and NRHP. Its mission is the preservation and adaptive reuse of Wardenclyffe, the century-old laboratory of electrical pioneer Nikola Tesla located in Shoreham, Long Island, New York.

In October 1994, a second application for formal nomination was filed. The New York State Office of Parks, Recreation and Historic Preservation conducted inspections and determined the facility meets New York State criteria for historic designation. A second visit was made on February 25, 2009. The site cannot be registered until it is nominated by a willing owner.

Designation of the structure as a National Landmark is awaiting completion of plant decommissioning activities by its present owner.

Museum 

In August 2012, concerned about an apparent offer to purchase the site and develop it for commercial use, web cartoon The Oatmeal launched a fundraiser for the Tesla Science Center to raise $1.7 million in order to purchase the property, with the hope of eventually building a museum on the grounds.

Jane Alcorn, president of the nonprofit group The Tesla Science Center at Wardenclyffe, and Matthew Inman, creator of The Oatmeal, collaborated in 2012 to honor "the Father of the Electric Age", by preserving the Wardenclyffe facility as a science center and museum. They initiated the Let's Build a Goddamn Tesla Museum fund-raising campaign on the Indiegogo crowdfunding site, to raise funding to buy the Wardenclyffe property and restore the facility. The project reached its goal of raising $850,000 within a week, more than exceeded the requested amount, including a $33,333 donation from the producers of the Tesla film "Fragments from Olympus-The Vision of Nikola Tesla". The campaign also attracted donations from benefactors such as Elon Musk, CEO of Tesla, Inc.

The money raised within one week was enough to get a matching grant from the state of New York, allowing the project to be able to meet the seller's asking price of $1.6 million; the state had agreed to match donations up to half that amount. A total of $1.37 million was donated, the matching grant from the State of New York brings the total collected to over $2.2 million. The surplus will be used to fund the cleaning and restoration of the property. Tesla, Wardenclyffe and the museum fundraising effort will be the subject of a new documentary being produced called Tower to the People – Tesla's Dream at Wardenclyffe Continues.

On May 2, 2013, The Tesla Science Center at Wardenclyffe announced that they had purchased the 15.69-acre laboratory site from Agfa Corporation and will begin to raise "about $10 million to create a science learning center and museum worthy of Tesla and his legacy."

On May 13, 2014, The Oatmeal published a comic called "What It's Like to Own a Model S, Part 2", in which they requested a further donation of $8 million from Tesla Motors founder Elon Musk in order to propel the museum toward completion. The next day, Musk stated on Twitter that he "would be happy to help." On July 10, 2014, during a 158th birthday celebration for Tesla at the Wardenclyffe site, it was announced that Musk would donate $1 million toward funding the museum, as well as having a Tesla Motors supercharging station installed onsite.

The center plans to offer several programs, including science teacher associations, conferences, symposia, field trips, associations with science competitions, and other science programs. Planned permanent exhibits include a Tesla exhibit, exploratorium-type exhibits, and a living museum. On September 23, 2013, the President of Serbia, Tomislav Nikolić, unveiled a monument to Tesla at the Wardenclyffe site. Nikolić said that he had planned to push for the monument to be displayed at the United Nations, but chose Wardenclyffe once he learned it had been purchased for the center.

Facility grounds 
Wardenclyffe is located near the Shoreham Post Office and Shoreham Fire House on Route 25A in Shoreham, Long Island, New York. Wardenclyffe was divided into two main sections. The tower, which was located in the back, and the main building now compose the entire facility grounds.

Related patents 

 "Means for Generating Electric Currents", February 6, 1894
 "Electrical Transformer", November 2, 1897
 "Method Of Utilizing Radiant Energy",  November 5, 1901
 "Method of Signaling", March 17, 1903
 "System of Signaling", April 14, 1903
 "Art of Transmitting Electrical Energy Through the Natural Mediums", April 18, 1905
 "Apparatus for Transmitting Electrical Energy", January 18, 1902, December 1, 1914

See also 

 Magnifying transmitter
 Wireless energy transmission
 National Register of Historic Places listings in Brookhaven (town), New York
 Free energy suppression conspiracy theory

References 
Notes

Further reading
 Anderson, Leland, "Rare Notes from Tesla on Wardenclyffe" in Electric Spacecraft – A journal of Interactive Research, Issue 26, September 14, 1998. Contains copies of rare documents from the Tesla Museum in Belgrade including Tesla's notes and sketches from 1901
 Bass, Robert W., "Self-Sustained Non-Hertzian Longitudal Wave Oscillations as a Rigorous Solution of Maxwell's Equations for Electromagnetic Radiation". Inventek Enterprises, Inc., Las Vegas, Nevada.
 "Boundless Space: A Bus Bar". The Electrical World, Vol 32, No. 19.
 Massie, Walter Wentworth, "Wireless telegraphy and telephony popularly explained". New York, Van Nostrand. 1908.
 Rather, John, "Tesla, a Little-Recognized Genius, Left Mark in Shoreham". The New York Times. Long Island Weekly Desk.
 Tesla, Nikola, "The Transmission of Electrical Energy Without Wires", Electrical World and Engineer, March 5, 1904.
 Tesla, Nikola, "World System of Wireless Transmission of Energy", Telegraph and Telegraph Age, October 16, 1927.

External links 

 PBS Tower of Dreams the wireless global communications
 
 Tesla Science Center at Wardenclyffe

Nikola Tesla
Buildings and structures in Suffolk County, New York
Inventions by Nikola Tesla
National Register of Historic Places in Brookhaven (town), New York
National Register of Historic Places in Suffolk County, New York
Towers completed in 1901
Towers in New York (state)
Wireless energy transfer
Buildings and structures demolished in 1917
Demolished buildings and structures in New York (state)